The different varieties of the Spanish language spoken in the Americas are distinct from each other as well as from those varieties spoken in the Iberian peninsula, collectively known as Peninsular Spanish and Spanish spoken elsewhere, such as in Africa and Asia. There is great diversity among the various Latin American vernaculars, and there are no traits shared by all of them which are not also in existence in one or more of the variants of Spanish used in Spain. A Latin American "standard" does, however, vary from the Castilian "standard" register used in television and notably the dubbing industry.  Of the more than 469 million people who speak Spanish as their native language, more than 422 million are in Latin America, the United States and Canada.. The total amount of native and non-native speakers of Spanish is approximately 592 million.

There are numerous regional particularities and idiomatic expressions within Spanish. In Latin American Spanish, loanwords directly from English are relatively more frequent, and often foreign spellings are left intact. One notable trend is the higher abundance of loan words taken from English in Latin America as well as words derived from English. The Latin American Spanish word for "computer" is computadora, whereas the word used in Spain is ordenador, and each word sounds foreign in the region where it is not used. Some differences are due to Iberian Spanish having a stronger French influence than Latin America, where, for geopolitical reasons, the United States influence has been predominant throughout the twentieth century.

Main features 
Pronunciation varies from country to country and from region to region, just as English pronunciation varies from one place to another. In general terms, the speech of the Americas shows many common features akin to southern Spanish variants, especially to western Andalusia (Seville, Cádiz) and the  Canary Islands. Coastal language vernaculars throughout Hispanic America show particularly strong similarities to Atlantic-Andalusian speech patterns while inland regions in Mexico and Andean countries are not similar to any particular dialect in Spain.
However, seseo is also typical of the speech of many Andalusians and all Canary islanders. Andalusia's and the Canary Islands' predominant position in the conquest and subsequent immigration to Hispanic America from Spain is thought to be the reason for the absence of this distinction in most American Spanish dialects.
Most of Spain, particularly the regions that have a distinctive  phoneme, realize  with the tip of tongue against the alveolar ridge. Phonetically this is an "apico-alveolar" "grave" sibilant , with a weak "hushing" sound reminiscent of  fricatives.
The second-person familiar plural pronoun vosotros is not generally used in daily speech in Latin American dialects of Spanish; the formal ustedes is used at all levels of familiarity. However, vosotros and its conjugations are known and seen occasionally in writing or oratory, especially in formal, ritualized contexts.
Latin America lacks the  found in most of Spain.
 As mentioned, Anglicisms are far more common in Hispanic America than in Spain, due to the stronger and more direct US influence.
 Equally, Indigenous languages have left their mark on Hispanic American Spanish, a fact which is particularly evident in vocabulary to do with flora, fauna and cultural habits. Nevertheless, European Spanish has also absorbed numerous words of Amerindian origin, although for historical reasons, the vast majority of these are taken from Nahuatl and various Caribbean languages.
 Arabic-derived words with Latinate doublets are common in Hispanic American Spanish, being influenced by Andalusian Spanish, such as alcoba ("bedroom") instead of standard cuarto, recámara, and many others and alhaja ("jewel") instead of standard joya. In this sense Hispanic American Spanish is closer to the dialects spoken in the south of Spain.
 See List of words having different meanings in Spain and Hispanic America.
However realization varies greatly from region to region. However, yeísmo is an expanding and now dominant feature of European Spanish, particularly in urban speech (Madrid, Toledo) and especially in Andalusia and the Canary Islands, though in some rural areas  has not completely disappeared.
This happens at a reduced level in Ecuador and Chile as well. It is a feature brought from Extremadura and westernmost Andalusia.
In many Andean regions the alveolar trill of rata and carro is realized as an retroflex fricative  or even as a voiced apico-alveolar . The alveolar approximant realization is particularly associated with an Indigenous substrate and it is quite common in Andean regions, especially in inland Ecuador, Peru, most of Bolivia and in parts of northern Argentina and Paraguay.
In word-final position,  will usually be one of these:
 a trill, a tap, approximant, or elided when followed by a consonant or a pause, as in amo paterno 'paternal love', amor ,
 a tap, approximant, or  when the followed by a vowel-initial word, as in amo eterno 'eternal love').
A notable exception is the Department of Nariño and most Costeño speech (Atlantic coastal dialects) which feature the soft, fricative realizations common to all other Hispanic American and European dialects.
Word-final  is velar  in much Latin American Spanish speech; this means a word like pan (bread) is often articulated . To an English-speaker, those speakers that have a velar nasal for word-final  make pan sound like pang''. Velarization of word-final  is so widespread in the Americas that it is easier to mention those regions that maintain an alveolar : most of Mexico, Colombia (except for coastal dialects) and Argentina (except for some northern regions). Elsewhere, velarization is common, although alveolar word-final  can appear among some educated speakers, especially in the media or in singing. Velar word-final  is also frequent in Spain, especially in southern Spanish dialects (Andalusia and the Canary Islands) and in the Northwest: Galicia, Asturias and León.

Local variations

North America

 Mexican Spanish
 Spanish language in the United States
Isleño Spanish
Sabine River Spanish
New Mexican Spanish
Puerto Rican Spanish
Chicano Spanish

Central America

Belizean Spanish
 Costa Rican Spanish
 Guatemalan Spanish
 Honduran Spanish
 Nicaraguan Spanish
 Panamanian Spanish
 Salvadoran Spanish

The Caribbean

 Cuban Spanish
 Dominican Spanish
 Puerto Rican Spanish
 Trinidadian Spanish

South America

 Amazonic Spanish
 Andean Spanish
 Bolivian Spanish
 Chilean Spanish
 Chilote Spanish
 Colombian Spanish
 Ecuadorian Spanish
 Paraguayan Spanish
 Peruvian Spanish
Peruvian Coast Spanish
 Rioplatense Spanish
 Argentinian Spanish
 Uruguayan Spanish
 Venezuelan Spanish
Maracucho Spanish

See also 
 Spanish language in the United States
 Philippine Spanish
 Equatoguinean Spanish
 Spanish Filipino
 Latin Union
 Spanish-language literature
 Hispanic

References

External links 
 Diccionario de americanismos by the Asociación de Academias de la Lengua Española
 Latin American Dictionary with variants for every country